John Henry King (1880–1965) was an English prelate of the Catholic Church. He served as the fourth Bishop of the Diocese of Portsmouth from 1941 to 1965.

Life
John Henry King was born in Wardour on 16 September 1880. He was ordained at St Helier, Jersey on 20 November 1904 as a priest for the Diocese of Portsmouth.

He was appointed an Auxiliary Bishop of Portsmouth and Titular Bishop of Opus on 28 May 1938. His consecration to the Episcopate took place on 15 July 1938, the principal consecrator was Bishop William Timothy Cotter of Portsmouth, and the principal co-consecrators were Bishop Peter Amigo of Southwark and William Francis Brown, Titular Bishop of Pella and Auxiliary Bishop of Southwark.

Three years later, he was appointed Bishop of Portsmouth on 4 June 1941. On 6 June 1954, he was appointed the personal title Archbishop.

King died in office on 23 March 1965, aged 84. He is buried at the Winchester Catholic Cemetery.

References 

1880 births
1965 deaths
Roman Catholic bishops of Portsmouth
20th-century Roman Catholic bishops in England
People from Wiltshire